Cliff Wang is a researcher at North Carolina State university. He was named a Fellow of the Institute of Electrical and Electronics Engineers (IEEE) in 2016 for his leadership in trusted computing and communication systems.

References 

Fellow Members of the IEEE
21st-century American engineers
Living people
Year of birth missing (living people)
North Carolina State University alumni
Place of birth missing (living people)